The Bad Griesbach Challenge Tour was a golf tournament on the Challenge Tour. It was played for the first time in July 2013 at the Hartl Resort in Bad Griesbach, Germany.

Andrea Pavan won the inaugural tournament.

Winners

References

External links
Coverage on the Challenge Tour's official site

Former Challenge Tour events
Golf tournaments in Germany
Sports competitions in Bavaria
Recurring sporting events established in 2013